The lawn bowls competition at the 1990 Commonwealth Games took place in Auckland, New Zealand from 24 January until 3 February 1990.

Medal table

Medallists

Results

Men's singles – round robin

Section A

Section B

Finals 
Third Place Play Off
 Corsie bt  Bryant 25-17

Final
 Parrella bt  McMahon 25-14

Men's pairs – round robin

Section A

Section B

Finals 
Third Place Play Off
 New Zealand bt  Wales 24-17

Final
 Australia bt  Canada 23-15

Men's fours – round robin

Section A

Section B

Finals 
Third Place Play Off
 New Zealand bt  Australia 21-13 

Final
 Scotland bt  Northern Ireland 19-14

Women's singles – round robin

Section A

Section B

Finals 
Third Place Play Off
 Johnston bt  Hefford 25-15

Final
 Vada Tau bt  Khan 25-18

Women's pairs – round robin

Section A

Section B

Finals 
Third Place Play Off
 England bt  Scotland 22-14

Final
 New Zealand bt  Australia 23-13

Women's fours – round robin

Section A

Section B

Finals 
Third Place Play Off
 Hong Kong bt  Scotland 21-20

Final
 Australia bt  New Zealand 20-18

References

See also
List of Commonwealth Games medallists in lawn bowls
Lawn bowls at the Commonwealth Games

Lawn bowls at the Commonwealth Games
1990 in bowls